László Botka (born February 21, 1973) is a Hungarian politician. Botka was a member of the Hungarian Socialist Party between 1991 and 2019, and the current mayor of Szeged.

Biography
László Botka was born on February 21, 1973, in Tiszaföldvár, Hungary, as the first of two sons of Lajos Botka and Julianna Mária Lukács, both secondary school teachers. He attended the Varga Katalin Secondary School in Szolnok. In 1991, he moved to Szeged to study at the Faculty of Law of the University of Szeged, from which he graduated in 1997. He joined the Hungarian Socialist Party in 1991. Between 1992 and 1994, he was leader of the socialist youth organization. In 1994, he was elected to represent Szeged in the National Assembly of Hungary, becoming the youngest of the MPs. He lost his seat in the general elections held in 1998, but he was re-elected in 2002, 2006 and 2010. In 2002, he was elected to Mayor of Szeged; he was re-elected in 2006, 2010, 2014 and 2019.

Upon the resignation of Attila Mesterházy following the disastrous 2014 European Parliament election, Botka was elected interim leader of the Socialist Party as chairman of the organization's National Election Committee.

Personal life
Botka is married to Dr Andrea Lugosi.

References

Living people
1973 births
Hungarian socialists
Hungarian Socialist Party politicians
Members of the National Assembly of Hungary (1994–1998)
Members of the National Assembly of Hungary (2002–2006)
Members of the National Assembly of Hungary (2006–2010)
Members of the National Assembly of Hungary (2010–2014)
People from Tiszaföldvár